Elizabeth Thomson may refer to:

 Elizabeth Thomson (artist)
 Elizabeth Thomson (linguist)
 Elizabeth Thomson (politician)
 Elizabeth Thomson (suffragist)

See also
 Elizabeth Thompson (disambiguation)